Dimitrios Kriezis was a Greek naval officer. He was the second son of Admiral and Greek War of Independence hero Antonios Kriezis. He served as the aide-de-camp of King George I of Greece, became Minister for Naval Affairs in the Nikolaos Deligiannis cabinet of 1895, and headed the Greek fleet's Ionian Sea squadron during the Greco-Turkish War of 1897.

He retired with the rank of Rear Admiral.

Sources 
 

19th-century Greek military personnel
Hellenic Navy admirals
Ministers of Naval Affairs of Greece
Greek military personnel of the Greco-Turkish War (1897)
Arvanites